Jackson Township is one of the fourteen townships of Pike County, Ohio, United States.  The 2000 census found 1,346 people in the township.

Geography
Located in the northeastern corner of the county, it borders the following townships:
Jefferson Township, Ross County - north
Jackson Township, Jackson County - northeast
Liberty Township, Jackson County - southeast
Beaver Township - south
Seal Township - southwest
Pee Pee Township - west
Franklin Township, Ross County - northwest

No municipalities are located in Jackson Township.

Name and history
It is one of thirty-seven Jackson Townships statewide.

Race relations

The eastern part of Jackson Township is unique among American communities due to a large number of white passing mixed-race individuals who choose to identify as African American.

Government
The township is governed by a three-member board of trustees, who are elected in November of odd-numbered years to a four-year term beginning on the following January 1. Two are elected in the year after the presidential election and one is elected in the year before it. There is also an elected township fiscal officer, who serves a four-year term beginning on April 1 of the year after the election, which is held in November of the year before the presidential election. Vacancies in the fiscal officership or on the board of trustees are filled by the remaining trustees.

References

External links
Pike County visitors bureau website
Township history

Townships in Pike County, Ohio
Townships in Ohio
Multiracial affairs in the United States